The Duchy of Kopanica (Principality of Kopanica;) was a Slavonic principality in Central Europe in present-day central and eastern Brandenburg. Its capital was Kopnik (today part of Berlin).

 
The Duchy was established as a Christian Duchy in the early 12th century and submitted to the Roman Catholic Archdiocese of Gniezno. It was a fief of the Kingdom of Poland in the mid-12th century. Its only ruler known by name was Iakša de Kopnik (1120-1176) of the Gryfici (Świebodzice) noble clan, a knight of the Order of the Holy Sepulchre. Iakša's prominent relative Eric of Pomerania (1381-1459, House of Griffins) continued the family tradition and also became a knight of the Order of the Holy Sepulchre. 

Until the Germanic invasion of the Wendish Crusade the Principality of Kopanica, supported by ancient noble families (Spyra, Duninowie…) from Silesia, issued at least five emissions of the brakteate of Iakša. Those brakteates from silver mines of Rozbark (today district of Bytom) of the Spyra dynasty (ancestors of parts of the Piast dynasty) were minted by Iakša's father-in-law Piotr Włostowic at Ołbin (Wrocław), then still Kingdom of Poland. 

Despite Kopanica being a Catholic Principality, Iakša being a knight of Order of the Holy Sepulchre and the Kopnik currency depicting the Patriarchal cross used by the Polish branch of the Order (established in 1163 by Iakša himself in Miechów, Kingdom of Poland), the Germans invaded the Principality using the pretext of christianization. 

Iakšas chapel of the Order of the Holy Sepulchre subsequently became Tempelhof of the Knights Templar and after the extermination of this mainly Celtic order in the beginning of the 14th century their property was taken by the Germanic Order of Saint John (Bailiwick of Brandenburg), known as Johanniterorden or simply Johanniter, which following strictly its germanization agenda became Lutheran. 

The Bargello in Florence displays a sword believed to be that of Iakša de Kopnik. 
 
The Jakšić noble family of Serbia may be connected to Iakša's own clan Gryfici (Świebodzice) or their parent house the Spyra (Sperun, Pérnuš). 

The ducal cape found in the Eberswalde Hoard from Finów shows the eight-petaled star of Svarog, a Slavic deity.

Etymology
The Slavic (Veneti) name Kopnik means a place at which some kind of digging related to irrigating, building, mining, also building a kopiec (kurhan, kurgan, tumulus,  barrow, mound) is being performed. Kopanica means an area belonging to or surrounding the place of Kopnik. Kopa is the name often used for mountains, also the original Vindelici name for the main mountain massive hosting kopalnie (mines) of the Hallstatt culture. 

Branibor means the protecting forest/woods and is still used for this area by the Czechs.

Iakša (Jakša, Jaksa, Jaxa, Iacza, Jacek…) is derived from the Slavic root iskati meaning to strike/split/sliver [stones], to make sparks/light, to glitter/shine and is related to such ancient names as Iskra (spark), Iškur (lord of the sparks/thunderbolts).

Geography

The territory of the Principality of Kopanica, named after its capital Kopnik consisted of central and eastern parts of Branibor, which was later eventually renamed Brandenburg. In the late 12th century, in the west it bordered other territories of the Polabian Slavs (Veneti) and in the south White Serbia of the Serbs, which were annexed into Germanic Holy Roman Empire. In the east the Principality of Kopanica bordered the Kingdom of Poland, which it was a fief of.

From 1153/1154 to 1157 the Slavic settlement Branibor was part of the Duchy, until it was conquered by Albert the Bear and under the German name of Brandenburg it became capital of the newly established March of Brandenburg. 

When in the years 1298-1405 the Kingdom of Bohemia incorporated the former White Serbia bordering Principality of Kopanica to the south it failed to incorporate their Slavic kinsmen of Kopanica and Branibor into their kingdom. Kingdom of Poland weakened by the Turko-Mongol invasions (up to 75% of casualties) also failed to recapture its fief.

See also
 Polabian Slavs 
 Polabian language 
 Wends 
 Wendish Crusade 
 Drang nach Osten 
 Saxon Eastern March

References
 Benedykt Zientara, Henryk Brodaty i jego czasy, Warszawa 2005;
 Atlas historyczny do 1815 roku, pod red. Julii Tazbir, Warszawa 2005;
 Tekst o Jaksie z Miechowa/Kopnika – dostęp: 30 grudnia 2009.

Kopanica
Fiefdoms of Poland